Melanis is a genus in the butterfly family Riodinidae present in the Neotropical realm.

Species 
Melanis aegates (Hewitson, 1874)
M. a. aegates present in Bolivia
M. a. albugo (Stichel, 1910) present in Paraguay
M. a. araguaya (Seitz, 1913) present in Brazil
M. a. cretiplaga (Stichel, 1910) present in Paraguay and Argentina
M. a. lilybaeus (Stichel, 1926) present in Brazil
M. a. limbata (Stichel, 1925) present in Brazil
M. a. melliplaga (Stichel, 1910) present in French Guiana and Suriname
Melanis alena (Hewitson, 1870) present in Brazil
Melanis boyi (Stichel, 1923) present in Brazil
Melanis cephise (Ménétriés, 1855)
M. c. cephise present in Nicaragua and Mexico
M. c. acroleuca (R. Felder, 1869) present in Mexico
M. c. huasteca J. & A. White, 1989 present in Mexico
Melanis cercopes (Hewitson, 1874) present in Bolivia
Melanis cinaron (C. & R. Felder, 1861) present in Colombia, Brazil and Peru
Melanis cratia (Hewitson, 1870)
Melanis electron (Fabricius, 1793)
M. e. electron present in French Guiana, Trinidad and Tobago and Venezuela
M. e. auriferax (Stichel, 1910) present in Brazil
M. e. epijarbas (Staudinger, 1888) present in Brazil
M. e. herellus (Snellen, 1887) present in Curaçao
M. e. melantho (Ménétriés, 1855) present in Panama, Guatemala and Nicaragua
M. e. pronostriga (Stichel, 1910) present in Colombia and Brazil
M. e. rabuscula (Stichel, 1910) present in Brazil and Peru
Melanis herminae (Zikán, 1952) present in Brazil
Melanis hillapana (Röber, 1904)
M. h. hillapana present in Bolivia and Peru
M. h. corinna (Zikán, 1952) present in Brazil
M. h. cratippa (Seitz, 1913) present in Brazil
M. h. impura (Stichel, 1910)
Melanis hodia (Butler, 1870) present in Venezuela
Melanis leucophlegma (Stichel, 1910) present in Peru
Melanis lioba (Zikán, 1952) present in Brazil
Melanis lycea Hübner, 1823 present in Brazil
Melanis marathon (C. & R. Felder, [1865])
M. m. marathon present in Venezuela and Colombia
M. m. assimulata (Stichel, 1910) present in Colombia
M. m. charon (Butler, 1874) present in Brazil
M. m. stenotaenia Röber, 1904 present in Peru
Melanis melandra Hübner, [1819] present in Suriname
Melanis melaniae (Stichel, 1930) present in Brazil
Melanis opites (Hewitson, 1875) present in Brazil
Melanis passiena (Hewitson, 1870) present in Colombia
Melanis pixe (Boisduval, [1836])
M. p. pixe present in the US at Texas and Mexico
M. p. corvina (Stichel, 1910) present in Colombia
M. p. sanguinea (Stichel, 1910) present in Panama and Costa Rica
Melanis seleukia (Stichel, 1910) present in Brazil
Melanis smithiae (Westwood, 1851)
M. s. smithiae present in Bolivia and Brazil
M. s. xarifa (Hewitson, [1853]) present in Colombia and Venezuela
Melanis unxia (Hewitson, [1853]) present in Brazil
Melanis vidali (Dognin, 1891) present in Ecuador
Melanis volusia (Hewitson, [1853]) present in Brazil
Melanis xenia (Hewitson, [1853])
M. x. xenia present in Brazil
M. x. ambryllis (Hewitson, 1874) present in Paraguay and Bolivia
Melanis yeda (Zikán, 1952) present in Brazil

Sources 
Melanis sur funet

External links
tableau des Melanis sur butterflies of america
Melanis dans Melanis smithiae de learn about butterflies
TOL

Riodininae
Riodinidae of South America
Butterfly genera
Taxa named by Jacob Hübner